Ilma Kazazić (born 26 May 1998) is an alpine skier who served as flag-bearer at the 2018 Winter Paralympics Parade of Nations for Bosnia and Herzegovina at the 2018 Winter Paralympics.

She finished in 8th in Giant Slalom standing at 2019 World Para Alpine Skiing Championships.

References

External links 
 

1998 births
Living people
Bosnia and Herzegovina female alpine skiers
Alpine skiers at the 2018 Winter Paralympics